Phantom is the second studio album by French metalcore band Betraying the Martyrs. The album was released on 15 July 2014 through Sumerian Records. It is the band's only album to feature drummer Mark Mironov.

Background
The first song to be released from the album was "Where the World Ends", released on 28 May 2014. The song was first performed live on 25 May in Lyon, France. On 17 June, a lyric video for the second single, "Jigsaw", was released.

"Let It Go" is a cover of the song from the 2013 film, Frozen. The cover was critically acclaimed, with AllMusic contributor Gregory Heaney stating that the cover conveys the same emotion as the original (sung by Idina Menzel) while radically altering the delivery, adding that it "feels like a testament to both the versatility of metal and the universality of show tunes." Heavy metal website MetalSucks labelled the cover as "truly exceptional" in an otherwise negative review of the album. However, Under the Gun named the cover as their "least metal moment of the week" on 14 July. The cover became one of the band's most popular songs and has accumulated 8.5 million views on YouTube, as of April 2022.

The song "Legends Never Die" is a tribute dedicated to late Suicide Silence vocalist Mitch Lucker, who agreed to appear on one of the album's tracks on 31 October but died a day later in an accident.

Track listing
All songs written and composed by Betraying the Martyrs, except "Let It Go", which was originally written by Robert Lopez and Kristen Anderson-Lopez.

Personnel 

Betraying the Martyrs
Aaron Matts – lead vocals
Lucas D'Angelo –  lead guitar, backing vocals, production, engineering
Baptiste Vigier – rhythm guitar
Valentin Hauser – bass
Mark Mironov – drums
Victor Guillet – keyboards, piano, synthesizers, clean vocals

Additional musicians
Gus Farias of Volumes – guest vocals on track 6

Additional personnel
Betraying the Martyrs and Nick Walters – vocal production
Allan Hessler – vocal engineering, vocal production
Theophile Denis – drum engineering
Nicolas Delestrade – mastering, mixing
George Vallee – publicity
Daniel McBride – artwork, layout
Ann Buster – band photo

References 

Betraying the Martyrs albums
2014 albums
Sumerian Records albums